Donald Willard MacKay (January 3, 1874 – January 26, 1952) was a Canadian politician. He represented the electoral district of Queens in the Nova Scotia House of Assembly from 1928 to 1933. He was a Liberal-Conservative member.

MacKay was born in 1874 at Santa Rosa, California, and moved to Nova Scotia in 1877. He married Reta Cook, and was a tailor by career. MacKay served as mayor and town councillor in Liverpool, Nova Scotia. MacKay entered provincial politics in 1928 when he was elected in the dual-member Queens County riding with William Lorimer Hall. He did not reoffer in the 1933 election. MacKay died at Liverpool on January 26, 1952.

References

1874 births
1952 deaths
Mayors of places in Nova Scotia
Progressive Conservative Association of Nova Scotia MLAs
People from Queens County, Nova Scotia
Nova Scotia municipal councillors
20th-century Canadian politicians
People from Santa Rosa, California
American emigrants to Canada
Canadian tailors